Won't You Be My Neighbor? is a 2018 American documentary film about the life and guiding philosophy of Fred Rogers, the host and creator of Mister Rogers' Neighborhood, directed by Morgan Neville. The trailer for the film debuted on what would have been Rogers' 90th birthday, March 20, 2018.

The film premiered at the 2018 Sundance Film Festival and was released in the United States on June 8, 2018. It received acclaim from critics and audiences and grossed over $22 million, becoming the top-grossing biographical documentary ever produced and the 12th largest-grossing documentary ever produced.

It was nominated for numerous awards, won the Independent Spirit Award for Best Documentary Feature, and was chosen by Time magazine as one of its top ten films of 2018.

Premise

Filmmaker Morgan Neville examines the life and legacy of Fred Rogers, the beloved host of the popular children's television program Mister Rogers' Neighborhood.

Production
One of the film's producers was Nicholas Ma, son of the famed cellist Yo-Yo Ma. As a child, the younger Ma appeared twice as himself in Mister Rogers' Neighborhood.

Appearances

 Joanne Rogers (Fred's widow)
 John Rogers (Fred's son)
 Jim Rogers (Fred's son)
 Elaine Rogers Crozier (Fred's sister)
 Margy Whitmer (Fred's producer from 1979 onward)
 Hedda Sharapan
 François Scarborough Clemmons
 Tom Junod
 Yo-Yo Ma
 Joe Negri
 David Newell (Mr. McFeely)
 Howard and Pam Erlanger (parents of Jeff Erlanger)
 Jeff Erlanger in archival recordings
 Fred Rogers in archival recordings
 Koko in archival recordings
 Hilary Hahn

Release

Won't You Be My Neighbor? was shown at many film festivals including on January 19, 2018, at the Sundance Film Festival, February 24, 2018, at the Boulder International Film Festival, March 2, 2018, at the True/False Film Festival, March 16, 2018, at the Miami Film Festival, and May 5, 2018, at the Montclair Film Festival. It had a limited release in US theaters on June 15, 2018. PBS aired the film on February 9, 2019, as part of the network's Independent Lens series.

In November 2018, director Morgan Neville revealed that the original title of the film was The Radical Mister Rogers, but after the election of Donald Trump, the term "radical" had a negative connotation according to Neville.

Reception

Box office

Won't You Be My Neighbor? made $475,419 from 29 theaters in its first weekend, and $1 million from 96 theaters in its second. Expanding to 348 theaters the following week, it grossed $1.9 million, finishing tenth at the box office. It was added to an additional 306 theaters in its fourth weekend (for a total of 654) and made $2.5 million, again finishing 10th. It made $2.6 million the following weekend, becoming the highest-grossing documentary of 2018 in the process with $12.4 million.

On July 27, the film became the highest-grossing biographical documentary of all-time, and on August 12 passed Bowling for Columbine to become the 12th-highest-grossing documentary overall.

Critical response

The website's critical consensus reads, "Won't You Be My Neighbor? takes a fittingly patient and honest look at the life and legacy of a television pioneer whose work has enriched generations." On Metacritic, the film has a weighted average score of 85 out of 100, based on 41 critics, indicating "universal acclaim".

Leslie Felperin of The Guardian gave the film a score of 4 stars out of 5, writing that the film "revel's that [Rogers] really was just what he seemed to be at first innocent sight: a kind-hearted, square but saintly man who genuinely loved and understood children." Amy Nicholson of Variety wrote: "Neville's fantastic archival footage reveals the man through his work—or at least, it reveals his philosophies, if not the childhood memories that gave Rogers the ability to understand a four-year-old's brain, almost as if he still carried his in his cardigan pocket."

David Edelstein of New York magazine wrote: "the most important thing we’re meant to take away is that no matter how we look or feel (sad, mad, plaid), we’re special, each of us, loved unconditionally by this nice, nice man." He concluded: "Won’t You Be My Neighbor? is a wonderful breather from reality, from which you come back more conscious of — and dismayed by — the hate that more than ever runs the world."

Peter Travers of the Rolling Stone wrote, "funny, touching...and timeless."

J. R. Jones, writing for the Chicago Reader, was more critical of the film in his review, saying: "Nobody wants to hate on Mr. Rogers, so Neville quickly brushes aside the conservative criticism that Mister Rogers' Neighborhood...may have helped foster our modern American culture of self-involvement and hypersensitivity. This gentle, positive treatment of Rogers coincides with the show's values but devalues his enormous social importance."

In December 2018, former US President Barack Obama listed the film as one of his favorite films of 2018.

Accolades

See also

 A Beautiful Day in the Neighborhood, a 2019 biopic about Fred Rogers starring Tom Hanks

References

External links
 
 
 
 

2018 films
American documentary films
Biographical documentary films
Documentary films about children
Documentary films about television
Films directed by Morgan Neville
2018 documentary films
Films about Fred Rogers
Films based on newspaper and magazine articles
Focus Features films
2010s English-language films
2010s American films